Fernando Robles Capalla is a Roman Catholic archbishop-emeritus of the Archdiocese of Davao. He was born on November 1, 1934 in Leon, Iloilo Province. He was succeeded by Romulo Valles as archbishop of Davao on February 11, 2012.

Educational background
Fernando started his education at Leon Central Elementary School in his hometown. He attended secondary schooling at Colegio de San Agustin in Iloilo City. His continued his studies at St. Vincent Ferrer Seminary in Jaro, Iloilo City from 1950-1961. He took further studies from St. John's University in New York, USA in 1967, earning an MA in English Literature.

Priesthood
He was ordained priest on March 18, 1961 at the age of 26 as a diocesan priest of the Archdiocese of Jaro. He was appointed as auxiliary bishop of Davao on April 2, 1975 at the age of 40. He was also appointed as titular bishop of Grumentum on that same date. On April 25, 1977 he was appointed as bishop-prelate of Iligan City in Lanao del Norte province and subsequently appointed as bishop on November 15, 1982 when it was raised to a full-fledged diocese. In 1987, Pope John Paul II appointed him Apostolic Administrator of the newly created Prelature of St. Mary's in Marawi City, Lanao del Sur.

Archbishop of Davao
He became the Coadjutor Archbishop of Davao on June 28, 1994. He was formally installed to lead the archdiocese as its third archbishop and metropolitan in November 28, 1996.  He served as President of the Catholic Bishops' Conference of the Philippines (CBCP) for one term, from December 2003 to December 2005. Archbishop Capalla is a Council Member of the Federation of Asian Bishops Conference (FABC) and is one of the Founders/Convenors of the Bishops-Ulama Conference. For over a decade now, he has been a Member of the Pontifical Council for Interreligious Dialogue.

Archbishop Capalla promotes inter-religious dialogue among the tri-people of Mindanao- the Christians, the Muslims and the Lumads. Archbishop Capalla was succeeded by Zamboanga Archbishop Romulo Valles as Primate of Davao.

References

External links

1934 births
People from Iloilo
20th-century Roman Catholic archbishops in the Philippines
21st-century Roman Catholic archbishops in the Philippines
Living people
Visayan people
Roman Catholic archbishops of Davao
Presidents of the Catholic Bishops' Conference of the Philippines